In the Land of the Cactus is a 1913 silent film short produced by the Lubin Manufacturing Company of Philadelphia. It was directed, written by and starring Romaine Fielding. Mary Ryan also costars. It is not to be confused with a 1911 American Film Company film of the same name.

Cast
Romaine Fielding - Ramon
Mary Ryan - Estelle Royster
Robyn Adair - Bob Armabile
Richard Wangermann -

References

External links
 In the Land of the Cactus at IMDb.com

1913 films
Films directed by Romaine Fielding
1913 short films
American silent short films
Lubin Manufacturing Company films
American black-and-white films
1910s American films